The British Diving Championships - plain diving winners formerly the (Amateur Swimming Association (ASA) National Championships) are listed below.

Plain diving champions

See also
British Swimming

References

Swimming in the United Kingdom
Diving in the United Kingdom